Syed Rahim (14 July 1929 – 7 August 2014) was an Indian cricketer. He played first-class cricket for Madhya Pradesh and Vidarbha between 1946 and 1966.

References

External links
 

1929 births
2014 deaths
Indian cricketers
Madhya Pradesh cricketers
Vidarbha cricketers
Cricketers from Nagpur